The Two-man competition at the IBSF World Championships 2021 was held on 6 and 7 February 2021.

Results
The first two runs were started on 6 February at 10:00 and the last two runs on 7 February at 14:30.

References

Two-man